The 2008–09 FA Cup qualifying rounds opened the 128th season of competition in England for 'The Football Association Challenge Cup' (FA Cup), the world's oldest association football single knockout competition. A new record 762 clubs were accepted for the competition, up 33 from the previous season's 729 – completing a significant increase of 75 teams (11%) from the 687 clubs just two seasons earlier. South Normanton Athletic folded before the fixtures were released, leaving 761 clubs to appear in the draw.

The large number of clubs entering the tournament from lower down (Levels 5 through 10) in the English football pyramid meant that the competition started with six rounds of preliminary (2) and qualifying (4) knockouts for these non-League teams. The 32 winning teams from Fourth Round Qualifying progressed to the First round proper, where League teams tiered at Levels 3 and 4 entered the competition.

Calendar
The calendar for the 2008–09 FA Cup qualifying rounds, as announced by The Football Association.

Extra preliminary round
The draw for the extra preliminary round was announced on The FA's website on 1 July 2008. 406 clubs from Level 9 and Level 10 of English football, entered at this stage of the competition.

Preliminary round
Matches in the preliminary round were played on the weekend of 30 August 2008, with replays played on 2 September and 3 September 2008. The draw for the round was announced on The FA's website on 1 July 2008. A total of 332 clubs took part in this stage of the competition, including the 203 winners from the extra preliminary round and 129 entering at this stage from the six leagues at Level 8 of English football. The round featured 52 clubs from Level 10 still in the competition, the lowest-ranked clubs in this round.

First round qualifying
Matches in the first round qualifying were played on the weekend of 13 September 2008. Replays were played on 16 and 17 September 2008. The draw for the round was announced on The FA's website on 1 July 2008. A total of 232 clubs took part in this stage of the competition, including the 166 winners from the preliminary round and 66 entering at this stage from the top division of the three leagues at Level 7 of English football. The round featured 14 clubs from Level 10 still in the competition, the lowest-ranked clubs in this round.

Second round qualifying
Matches in the second round qualifying were played on the weekend of 27 September 2008. A total of 160 clubs took part in this stage of the competition, including the 116 winners from the first round qualifying and 44 Level 6 clubs, from Conference North and Conference South, entering at this stage. Southam United from Level 10 of English football was the lowest-ranked club to qualify for this round of the competition.

Third round qualifying
Matches in the third round qualifying will be played on the weekend of 11 October 2008. The draw for the round was announced on The FA's website on 29 September 2008. A total of 80 clubs took part, all having progressed from the second round qualifying. Six clubs from Level 9 of English football were the lowest-ranked to qualify for this round of the competition.

Fourth round qualifying
Matches in the fourth round qualifying were played on the weekend of 25 October 2008. A total of 64 clubs took part, 40 having progressed from the third round qualifying and 24 clubs from the Conference Premier, forming Level 5 of English football, entering at this stage. Leiston from Level 9 of English football was the lowest-ranked club to qualify for this round of the competition.

Competition proper
See 2008–09 FA Cup for details of the rounds from the first round proper onwards.

References

External links
 Football Club History Database: FA Cup 2008-09
 The FA Cup Archive

Qual
FA Cup qualifying rounds